Lausanne Conference or Conference of Lausanne may refer to: 

 Lausanne Conference of 1922–1923, a peace conference to write a new treaty with Turkey
 Lausanne Conference on Faith and Order, 1927 ecumenical conference
 Lausanne Conference of 1932, a conference representing the end of the reparations that related to the 1919 Paris Peace Conference
 Lausanne Conference of 1949, related to Palestinian-Jewish negotiations and the 1949 Armistice Agreements
 First International Congress on World Evangelization, the Lausanne Conference in 1974

See also
 Lausanne Congress of Supreme Councils of 1875, a Freemasonry conference